"Never Surrender" is a song by Canadian singer Corey Hart. It was released in June 1985 as the first single from his second studio album, Boy in the Box. The song was number-one for four weeks in Canada and was Hart's highest charting single in the United States, reaching number three on the Billboard Hot 100 (topping the sales only chart for one week) in August 1985.

The song won a Juno Award in 1985 for the "Single of the Year", and was certified Platinum in Canada for sales of over 100,000 copies in 1985.

"Never Surrender" has been featured in the Hulu series Future Man (TV series) Episode 10 "Operation: Natal Attraction" and in the Netflix series Stranger Things, season 3, episode 1 "Suzie, Do You Copy?", The Goldbergs, season 7, episode 13 "Geoff the Pleaser".

In 2019, Hart released an updated version of the song on his EP Dreaming Time Again, performed as a slow piano ballad with a new "angels lead you home" coda. He released the new version as a single in 2020, highlighting its message of hope and resilience during the COVID-19 pandemic.

Composition

On the lyrical content, Hart said, "My mother influenced me with this ethic of never quitting on yourself or your dreams no matter how challenging or daunting. I also greatly admired Sir Winston Churchill, reading many biographies on his life. He used this expression 'Never Surrender' during the dark days of the Nazi attacks on Great Britain as a motivating inspiration for his countrymen."

Critical reception
AllMusic has since called "Never Surrender": "a soaring power ballad of empowerment, giving this album (Boy in the Box) a greater musical and emotional range than his (Hart's) debut." Regarding the song becoming another US hit single Hart said "I really think it's difficult breaking into America regardless of where you're from. I don't think it's any more difficult for a Canadian act than for a band from Oklahoma".

Music video
The music video features a story line of Hart leaving his home after an argument with his father and hitchhiking his way to a major city where he finds himself alone and ends with a 'live' performance with his band.  Portions of the video were filmed on Yonge Street, Spadina Avenue and Queen Street West in downtown Toronto, including the now defunct Crest Grill. The video's director, Rob Quartly, had worked with Hart on three previous music videos and Quartly was again nominated for a Juno Award for his work on this video.

Performers 
 Corey Hart – vocals
 Gary Breit – keyboards
 Jon Astley – Fairlight programming, Oberheim DMX
 Michael Hehir – guitars
 Russell Boswell – bass
 Bruce Moffet – percussion
 Andy Hamilton – saxophone

Charts

References

 Liner notes from Boy in the Box album
 MVDbase - List of Hart's videos
 Discogs - List of Hart's singles

1985 singles
1985 songs
Corey Hart (singer) songs
Aquarius Records (Canada) singles
EMI America Records singles
1980s ballads
RPM Top Singles number-one singles
Rock ballads
Juno Award for Single of the Year singles
Songs written by Corey Hart (singer)